The Artful Dodger is the ninth solo album of Ian Hunter. Impressed with the production on Dirty Laundry, Hunter collaborated again with Björn Nessjö on this album.
The album was initially released in Norway only, because Hunter felt that he needed management before he could release it in the UK and the US.
The track "Michael Picasso" was a tribute to the late Mick Ronson. It was recorded using recordings from the Mick Ronson Memorial Concert in 1994

The album received a broader re-release through MIG Music on July 7, 2014. This release features the original track listing plus one bonus track, "Fuck It Up".

Track listing 
All tracks written by Ian Hunter except where noted.
 "Too Much" – 4:44
 "Now Is the Time" – 4:54
 "Something to Believe in" – 5:46
 "Resurrection Mary" – 6:11
 "Walk on Water" (Hunter, Robbie McNasty) – 3:48
 "23A, Swan Hill" – 4:47
 "Michael Picasso" – 5:45
 "Open my Eyes" (Hunter, Darrell Bath) – 5:42
 "The Artful Dodger" – 4:21
 "Skeletons (In Your Closet)" (Hunter, Darrell Bath, Honest John Plain) – 4:00
 "Still the Same" – 5:06

Bonus Track On Reissue 
 “Fuck It Up” - 6:02

Personnel 
 Ian Hunter - lead vocals, acoustic and electric guitars, harp
 Darrell Bath - acoustic, electric and Baryton guitars, lead vocals
 Torstein Flakne - guitars, vocals
 Per Lindvall - drums, percussion
 Sven Lindvall - bass
 Robbie Alter - acoustic, electric and slide guitars
 Kjetil Bjerkestrand - keyboards
 Dennis Eliott - drums
 Pat Kilbride - bass, acoustic bass
 "Honest" John Plain - vocals, lead vocals
 Frode Alnaes - guitar
 Mariann Lisland - vocals
 Per Öisten Sörensen - vocals
 The Vertago String Quartet - strings

References 

1996 albums
Ian Hunter (singer) albums